Prapetno Brdo is a dispersed settlement in the Municipality of Tolmin in the Littoral region of Slovenia. It lies west of Šentviška Gora on the southern slopes of the mountains to the north of the Idrijca Valley. It includes the hamlets of Trata, Dolina, Golubovc, and Sleme.

References

External links

Prapetno Brdo on Geopedia

Populated places in the Municipality of Tolmin